Talalay is a surname. Notable people with the surname include:

 Denis Talalay (born 1992), Russian footballer
 Paul Talalay  (1923–2019), pharmacologist
 Rachel Talalay (born 1958), British-American film and television director and producer

See also 
 Talalay Process

Surnames